The Sabah Chinese Consolidated Party (SCCP) or  (PCBS) was a minor party which was formed in 1980. It claimed to represent the Chinese community in Sabah. In the 1981 state elections it joined forces with United Sabah National Organisation (USNO) and United Pasok Nunukragang National Organisation (PASOK) in an electoral pact to oppose to the ruling Sabah People's United Front (BERJAYA) and won one seat for N48 Bandar Tawau. However following the resignation of PCBS sole assemblyman Chan Tze Hiang, this seat was subsequently recaptured by Berjaya. PCBS decided not to contest the 1985 state election, and instead supported Joseph Pairin Kitingan's Parti Bersatu Sabah (PBS).

State election results

See also
Politics of Malaysia
List of political parties in Malaysia

References

1980 establishments in Malaysia
Defunct political parties in Sabah
Political parties established in 1980